Donald Eligon (1909 – 4 June 1937) was a Trinidadian cricketer. He played in four first-class matches for Trinidad and Tobago from 1933 to 1937. He died from blood poisoning that started from a nail in his boot.

See also
 List of Trinidadian representative cricketers

References

External links
 

1909 births
1937 deaths
Trinidad and Tobago cricketers